Spectracanthicus is a genus of suckermouth armored catfish endemic to the Tapajós, Xingu and Tocantins river basins in Brazil where often found in fast-flowing waters. They feed on algae and small invertebrates.

Species
There are currently five recognized species in this genus:

 Spectracanthicus murinus Nijssen & Isbrücker, 1987
 Spectracanthicus immaculatus Chamon & Rapp Py-Daniel, 2014
 Spectracanthicus punctatissimus Steindachner, 1881
 Spectracanthicus tocantinensis Chamon & Rapp Py-Daniel, 2014
 Spectracanthicus zuanoni Chamon & Rapp Py-Daniel, 2014

References

Ancistrini
Fish of South America
Fish of Brazil
Endemic fauna of Brazil
Catfish genera
Taxa named by Han Nijssen
Taxa named by Isaäc J. H. Isbrücker
Freshwater fish genera